Mount Grace School is a Mixed academy school based in Potters Bar, Hertfordshire.

History
Mount Grace was originally a Manor House built by Roger Fenton and named after his wife Grace. In 1949 the Manor House was used as a children's home and in 1954 the school itself was built.

Local football
Potters Bar Town F.C.(originally named Mount Grace Old Scholars) was established on 29 June 1960 by the then PE Master Ken Barrett along with pupils and other old scholars. This is why the nickname of the Towns team today is Scholars as the reference to Mount Grace School.The name was changed to Potters Bar Town FC.in 1991. In the early days of the team other staff members of the school also helped including Bert Wright, the school's Caretaker.

References

External links
 Official website.
 BBC | League Tables | Mount Grace School.

Academies in Hertfordshire
Potters Bar
Educational institutions established in 1954
1954 establishments in England
Secondary schools in Hertfordshire